Lanier County is a county in the south central portion of the U.S. state of Georgia. As of the 2020 census, the population was 9,877. The county seat and only incorporated municipality is Lakeland. The county is named after the Georgia poet Sidney Lanier.

Lanier County is part of the Valdosta, GA Metropolitan Statistical Area. Lanier shares Moody Air Force Base with Lowndes County on its western boundary.

Geography

The vast majority of Lanier County is in the Alapaha River sub-basin of the Suwannee River basin. Just a narrow section of the western border of the county, northeast and southeast of Ray City, is in the Withlacoochee River sub-basin of the same Suwannee River basin, and a very narrow section of the eastern border of Lanier County is in the Upper Suwannee River sub-basin of the same Suwannee River basin.

Major highways

  U.S. Route 84
  U.S. Route 129
  U.S. Route 221
  State Route 11
  State Route 11 Bypass
  State Route 31
  State Route 31 Connector
  State Route 37
  State Route 38
  State Route 64
  State Route 122
  State Route 122 Connector
  State Route 125
  State Route 135
  State Route 135 Bypass
  State Route 168

Major waterways
 Alapaha River
 Banks Lake

Railways

Previous
 CSX Transportation

Defunct
 Atlantic and Gulf Railroad
 Atlantic Coast Line Railroad
 Lakeland Railroad (Defunct, it was used from 1929 to 1957. It ran along the same path as the Milltown Air Line Railroad)
 Milltown Air Line Railroad (Defunct, it was used from 1904 to 1928. It ran from Lakeland to Naylor, Georgia)
 Plant System
 Waycross and Western Railroad (Defunct, it was used from 1912 to 1925 from Waycross, Georgia to Lakeland, Georgia. It roughly followed current Georgia State Route 122)

Adjacent counties
 Berrien County - northwest
 Atkinson County - north
 Clinch County - east
 Echols County - south
 Lowndes County - southwest

National protected area

The Banks Lake National Wildlife Refuge, established in 1985, hosts approximately 20,000 visitors annually. The county is known for its excellent fishing in the Alapaha River, Banks Lake National Wildlife Refuge as well as in its many small lakes.

Demographics

2000 census
As of the census of 2000, there were 7,847 people, 2,893 households, and 1,931 families living in the county. There were 3,011 housing units at an average density of 16 per square mile (6/km2). The racial makeup of the county was 76.61% White, 20.63% African American, 0.57% Native American, 0.36% Asian,  0.04% Pacific Islander, 0.59% from other races, and 1.20% from two or more races.  1.74% of the population were Hispanic or Latino of any race.

There were 2,593 households, out of which 37.60% had children under the age of 18 living with them, 55.00% were married couples living together, 13.70% had a female householder with no husband present, and 25.50% were non-families. 21.80% of all households were made up of individuals, and 9.40% had someone living alone who was 65 years of age or older.  The average household size was 2.69 and the average family size was 3.12.

In the county, the population was spread out, with 27.40% under the age of 18, 11.00% from 18 to 24, 30.50% from 25 to 44, 20.50% from 45 to 64, and 10.60% who were 65 years of age or older.  The median age was 33 years. For every 100 females, there were 102.70 males.  For every 100 females age 18 and over, there were 101.80 males.

The median income for a household in the county was $50,171, and the median income for a family was $54,512. Males had a median income of $46,023 versus $39,021 for females. The per capita income for the county was $43,690.  About 5.30% of families and 8.50% of the population were below the poverty line, including 12.90% of those under age 18 and 14.20% of those age 65 or over.

2010 census
As of the 2010 United States Census, there were 10,078 people, 3,608 households, and 2,626 families living in the county. The racial makeup of the county was 70.6% white, 23.7% black or African American, 1.0% Asian, 0.5% American Indian, 1.7% from other races, and 2.3% from two or more races. Those of Hispanic or Latino origin made up 4.6% of the population. In terms of ancestry, 14.0% were Irish, 11.5% were American, 11.0% were German, and 10.1% were English.

Of the 3,608  households, 40.7% had children under the age of 18 living with them, 52.0% were married couples living together, 15.6% had a female householder with no husband present, 27.2% were non-families, and 22.3% of all households were made up of individuals. The average household size was 2.72 and the average family size was 3.18. The median age was 33.4 years.

The median income for a household in the county was $37,522 and the median income for a family was $43,162. Males had a median income of $32,782 versus $21,712 for females. The per capita income for the county was $16,894. About 18.0% of families and 20.4% of the population were below the poverty line, including 28.8% of those under age 18 and 10.6% of those age 65 or over.

2020 census

As of the 2020 United States census, there were 9,877 people, 3,714 households, and 2,536 families residing in the county.

Economy
The county's economy has remained rural in nature, but the educational, health and social service sector was the largest employment category in 2006. Factors contributing to this economy include the presence of Moody Air Force Base (shared by adjoining Lowndes County), the several lakes and nature reserve, the hospital, and a large state correctional facility.

The top ten employers in Lanier County are:
 Moody Air Force Base
 Farmers & Merchants Bank
 Louis Smith Hospital
 Patten Probation Detention Center
 Georgia Department of Corrections
 Patten Seed Company
 City of Lakeland, Georgia
 Wausau Homes, Inc
 J.H. Harvey Co, LLC (parent company of Harveys Supermarkets)

Media
 Lanier County News - Legal organ and hometown newspaper since 1913. The paper was originally named The Milltown Advocate, but changed its name after Lanier County was formed in 1920.
 Lanier County Advocate (newspaper) - Legal organ newspaper as of January 1, 2015.

Historic sites
Historic sites include Governor Eurith D. Rivers' home, which was moved from its original spot on Banks Lake to West Main Street in Lakeland in the early 1980s; Union Baptist Church, located near Georgia Highway 135; and Fender Cemetery, located east of Lakeland at the junction of U.S. 221 and Georgia Highway 37 on land that once belonged to David Fender. The site of the cemetery, in which many of the area's first settlers are buried, was chosen so that mourners would not have to ferry their dead across the river for burial. Also, the "Murals of Milltown," which depict community life in the 1920s, grace the exteriors of buildings in downtown Lakeland.

Communities

Cities
 Lakeland
 Ray City

Census-designated place
 Stockton

Education

The Lanier County School District operates four schools: Lanier County Primary School, Lanier County Elementary School, Lanier County Middle School, and Lanier County High School.

Politics

See also

 National Register of Historic Places listings in Lanier County, Georgia
List of counties in Georgia

Notes

References
 GeorgiaInfo.com Lanier County Courthouse History
 Lanier County School System
 Lanier County History

External links

 

 
1920 establishments in Georgia (U.S. state)
Georgia (U.S. state) counties
Populated places established in 1920
Valdosta metropolitan area counties